William John Robert Nightingale (born 2 August 1995) is an English professional footballer who plays as a defender for  club AFC Wimbledon.

Career
Nightingale was born in Wandsworth, Greater London. He joined the AFC Wimbledon Academy at the age of nine, progressing through the ranks before making the step up to the first team at the age of 18. His first association with the first team came as an unused substitute in a 2–0 home loss to Torquay United on 11 January 2014. Nightingale was offered his first professional contract with AFC Wimbledon in May 2014.

Nightingale made his first-team debut on 17 January 2015 at the age of 19, coming on as an 89th-minute substitute in a 3–1 home defeat to Carlisle United. He was rewarded by being named in the starting line-up for the following match, a 2–1 home win against Accrington Stanley on 24 January 2015. He was named as the man of the match and was commended by manager Neal Ardley for his performance. He scored his first career goal on 7 April 2018 with a fourth-minute header in a 1–1 draw against Scunthorpe United.

He was named the club's Player of the Season for the 2018–19 campaign, which saw Wimbledon achieve survival despite being ten points adrift of safety in February. On 22 May 2019, he signed a new contract with AFC Wimbledon of an undisclosed length.

On 14 August 2021 during a 3–3 draw against Bolton Wanderers, Nightingale scored the first Wimbledon goal in front of fans at the newly built Plough Lane stadium.

Career statistics

Honours 
AFC Wimbledon
 League Two play-offs: 2016

Individual
AFC Wimbledon Player of the Year: 2018–19

References

External links
Profile at the AFC Wimbledon website

1995 births
Living people
Footballers from Wandsworth
English footballers
Association football defenders
AFC Wimbledon players
English Football League players